Elections to the Assembly of Representatives of Mandatory Palestine were held on 5 January 1931. Mapai emerged as the largest party, winning 27 of the 71 seats.

Electoral system
Voter choice was limited by ethnic group; Ashkenazi Jews could only vote for Ashkenazi lists, whilst Sephardic Jews and Yemenite Jews were similarly constrained. A total of 18 lists contested the election. The number of seats in the Assembly was reduced from 221 to 71.

Campaign
The elections were boycotted by Agudat Yisrael in protest at women being allowed to vote and the Yishuv's approach to religious education and ritual slaughter.

Results

Aftermath
Following the elections, the Assembly elected the 23-member Jewish National Council, with eleven elected from Mapai, four from the Sephardim Bloc, three from Mizrachi, three from the General Zionists and two from smaller parties. The Revisionists refused to join the Council on the basis that the Assembly had refused to pass three resolutions it presented on not taking part in the Legislative Council, overturning the decision of the Jewish Agency to take part in a round table conference or to not send members to negotiate with the British government.

References

Palestine
Elections in Israel
1931 in Mandatory Palestine
January 1931 events
1931 in Judaism
1931 elections in the British Empire